Tracy Chu Tsin-suet (born 28 June 1988) is a Hong Kong-born Canadian actress, television presenter and barrister.

Chu debuted in the entertainment industry through the Miss Hong Kong Pageant in 2012. In 2015, she won the Most Improved TVB Artiste awards at both the TVB Star Awards Malaysia and StarHub TVB Awards. In 2016, she played her first female leading role in the drama Over Run Over.

In September 2020, Chu officially became a barrister under “Denis Chang’s Chamber”.

Background 
Tracy Chu was born on 28 June 1988 in Hong Kong. She is the eldest of three girls. At the age of 8, Chu and her family immigrated to Vancouver, British Columbia, Canada. During the first few years, she found it difficult to adjust to the new environment since she spoke minimal English.

Chu graduated from Simon Fraser University, majoring in Business and Communication. She also has an 8th grade in piano. Upon graduation, Chu returned to Hong Kong alone and worked as an administrative assistant for 2 years before deciding to join the Miss Hong Kong pageant.

Career

Pageant career (2012)
Chu entered the 2012 Miss Hong Kong pageant as contestant #4. Despite being a fan favorites and many TVB artistes, including previous winners Samantha Ko, Suki Chui and TVB's executive officer Virginia Lok, Chu did not win the title, partly due to technical difficulties in the voting system.

The 2012 pageant was the first Miss Hong Kong pageant to hold viewers choice online voting. The winner was to be selected based on popular online votes by audiences. Chu placed 2nd Runner-up but many netizens and fellow TVB artistes felt Chu was robbed of the winning title mainly due to Chu was leading in online votes by 65% the day before the final event was held. Over 500 Hong Kong citizens filed a complaint against TVB with the Office of the Telecommunications Authority (OFTA) citing fraud was committed, when the winner was eventually decided by the judging panel.

TVB Deputy Director of External Affairs Tsang Sing-ming, later apologized to the press for TVB's computer servers being disrupted, resulting in a lot of viewers unable to vote for their favorite. He also commented that the winner had already been decided and that a recount would not be done.

Acting career (2013-2017)
After winning the Miss Hong Kong 2nd Runner-up title in 2012, Chu was cast for her first role in the medical drama The Hippocratic Crush II, acting opposite veteran Hong Kong actor Lawrence Ng. Her next drama, Tomorrow Is Another Day, had her starring opposite veteran actor Kenny Wong. Chu garnered multiple award nominations with this drama. In 2015, she earned positive reviews for her performance in the dramas Smooth Talker and The Fixer, both of which garnered her  the Favourite Most Improved TVB Artiste awards at both the TVB Star Awards Malaysia and the StarHub TVB Awards.

In 2015, with the departure of longtime TVB lead actresses Myolie Wu and Kate Tsui, Chu got her first female leading role in the 2016 drama Over Run Over, again earning positive comments. Her onscreen partnership with Vincent Wong was well received, for which they won the Most Popular Onscreen Partnership award at the 2016 TVB Anniversary Awards. In addition, Chu earned her first nominations for both the Best Actress award and Most Popular Female Character award, eventually being placed among top 5 in both categories.

In 2017, Chu starred in the drama Legal Mavericks. With her role in this drama, she was placed among top 5 for the Best Supporting Actress at the 2017 TVB Anniversary Awards.

Personal life
During a break from acting in September 2015, Chu enrolled full-time at The Chinese University of Hong Kong to pursue a master's degree in Corporate Communication. In September 2016, she enrolled at City University of Hong Kong School of Law to pursue a Juris Doctor degree. In September 2020, Chu became a barrister under Denis Chang’s Chamber.

By a media report on 28 June 2019, Chu confirmed that she was engaged and had lodged a Notice of Intention to marry her 5-year boyfriend, Dr Justin Ng. Their wedding party was held in Bali in August 2019.

Chu is best friends with Roxanne Tong, Angel Chiang, Jennifer Shum and Kayi Cheung.

Filmography

Television dramas

Films

Television Host

Awards and nominations

Miss Hong Kong 2012

TVB Anniversary Awards

|-
| rowspan="2" style="text-align:center;"| 2015
| rowspan="2"| The Fixer
| Best Supporting Actress
| 
|-
| Most Improved Female Artiste
| 
|-
| rowspan="6" style="text-align:center;"| 2016
| rowspan="4"| Over Run Over
| Best Actress
|  (Top 5)
|-
| Most Popular Female Character
|  (Top 5)
|-
| Most Popular Onscreen Partnership 
| 
|-
| rowspan="3" | Most Improved Female Artiste
| 
|-
| Speed of Life
| 
|-
| K9 Cop
| 
|-
| rowspan="2" style="text-align:center;"| 2017
| rowspan="2"| Legal Mavericks
| Best Supporting Actress
|  (Top 5)
|-
| Most Popular Female Character
| 
|}

TVB Star Awards Malaysia

|-
| style="text-align:center;"| 2014
| Tomorrow is Another Day
| rowspan="2" |  Favourite Most Improved TVB Female Artiste 
| 
|-
| rowspan="2" style="text-align:center;"| 2015
| Smooth Talker, The Fixer
| 
|-
| The Fixer
| Favourite TVB Supporting Actress
| 
|-
| rowspan="3" style="text-align:center;"| 2016
| rowspan="3"| Over Run Over
| Favourite TVB Actress
|  (Top 5)
|-
| Favourite TVB Drama Characters
| 
|-
|  Favourite TVB Onscreen Couple (with Vincent Wong) 
| 
|-
| rowspan="3" style="text-align:center;"| 2017
| rowspan="3"| Legal Mavericks
| Favourite TVB Supporting Actress
|  (Top 5)
|-
| Favourite TVB Drama Characters
| 
|-
| Favourite TVB Onscreen Couple (with Vincent Wong and Sisley Choi)
| 
|}

StarHub TVB Awards

|-
| rowspan="2" style="text-align:center;"| 2014
| rowspan="2"| Tomorrow is Another Day
| My Favourite TVB Supporting Actress
| 
|-
| rowspan="2" |  Most Improved TVB Artiste 
| 
|-
| style="text-align:center;"| 2015
| Smooth Talker, The Fixer
| 
|-
| rowspan="3" style="text-align:center;"| 2016
| rowspan="2"| Over Run Over 
| My Favourite TVB Actress
| 
|-
|  My Favourite TVB Female TV Characters 
| 
|-
| 
|  Tokyo Bust Express the Sassy Award 
| 
|-
| rowspan="3" style="text-align:center;"| 2017
| rowspan="2"| Legal Mavericks
| My Favourite TVB Supporting Actress
| 
|-
|  My Favourite TVB Female TV Characters 
| 
|}

People's Choice Television Awards 

|-
| style="text-align:center;"| 2016
| Over Run Over
| People's Choice Best Actress
|  (Ranked 2nd)
|-
| style="text-align:center;"| 2017
| Legal Mavericks
| People's Choice Most Improved Female Artiste 
|  (Ranked 4th)
|}

Hong Kong Television Awards 

|-
| style="text-align:center;"| 2017
| Legal Mavericks
| Best Supporting Actress in Drama Series 
|  (Ranked 4th)
|}

References

External links
Tracy Chu TVB artiste page

1988 births
Living people
Hong Kong film actresses
Hong Kong television actresses
TVB actors
21st-century Hong Kong actresses
Hong Kong emigrants to Canada